Kloss's mole (Euroscaptor klossi) is a species of mammal in the family Talpidae. It is found in Laos and Thailand. It was named after zoologist C. Boden Kloss.

The Malaysian mole (E. malayanus) was formerly considered a subspecies, but a 2008 study supported it being a distinct species.

References

Euroscaptor
Mammals of Laos
Mammals of Thailand
Mammals described in 1929
Taxa named by Oldfield Thomas
Taxonomy articles created by Polbot